Szeroki may refer to the following places in Poland:

Szeroki Bór
Szeroki Bór Piski
Szeroki Kamień